Nancy Gutiérrez Vásquez (born 2 June 1987) is an American-born Mexican former footballer who played as a defender. She was a member of the Mexico women's national team.

Club career
Gutiérrez played for Arsenal Soccer in the United States.

International career
Gutiérrez represented Mexico at the 2004 CONCACAF U-19 Women's Qualifying Tournament. At senior level, she played the 2004 Summer Olympics.

See also
 Mexico at the 2004 Summer Olympics

References

External links
 
 Profile at sports-reference.com

1987 births
Living people
Citizens of Mexico through descent
Mexican women's footballers
Women's association football defenders
Mexico women's international footballers
Olympic footballers of Mexico
Footballers at the 2004 Summer Olympics
American women's soccer players
Soccer players from Los Angeles
American sportspeople of Mexican descent
Cerritos College alumni
21st-century American women